Ministry of Public Works and Transport  may refer to:
 Ministry of Public Works and Transport (Bahamas)
 Ministry of Public Works and Transport (Cambodia)
 Minister of Public Works and Transport (Hungary) (1848-1889)
Ministry of Public Works and Transport (Laos)
 Ministry of Public Works and Transport (Lebanon)
 Ministry of Public Works and Transport (Spain)

See also 
 List of public works ministries